is a fighting video game for the PlayStation developed by DreamFactory and published by Square in 1996. The game was DreamFactory's first release, as well as Square's first release on the CD-based console.

Tobal No. 1 marks Square's first incursion into the fighting game genre, although an adventure-like quest mode is part of the game. The game's mechanics were designed with the aid of fighter game designer Seiichi Ishii, while all the characters were designed by Akira Toriyama of Dragon Ball fame. The sequel, Tobal 2, was never released in North America and Europe.

Packaged with both the North American and Japanese version of the game was a sampler disc featuring a pre-release playable demo of Final Fantasy VII and video previews of Final Fantasy Tactics, Bushido Blade, and SaGa Frontier.

Gameplay
Tobal No. 1 has a tournament mode, two player versus mode, practice mode, and the unique quest mode, all of which utilize the same fighting system. The game runs at up to a smooth 60 frames per second due to its lack of textured polygons and reduced details which gave the game a distinctive look in comparison to other fighting games at the time. The game's controls allow full freedom of movement in the ring as long as the player faces the opponent. The player has the ability to dash and jump, and certain buttons execute high, medium, and low attacks for each character. Tobal No. 1 also has a grappling and blocking system, offering the player a variety of throws and counter moves.

The "Quest Mode" combines the game's fighting controls with three-dimensional dungeon exploration. The player must advance down a number of floors, contend with traps, and engage in fights with a variety of enemies including the game's playable characters. Several items can be found, dropped by enemies, or bought using crystals. These items can be picked up, consumed, or thrown at enemies, and include foodstuffs that can restore the player's HP or potions that have a range of effects including raising the player's maximum health or bringing it down to 1 point. There is no way to save one's progress, and dying means starting over from the beginning. Defeating certain characters in this mode unlocks them as playable characters in the game's other modes.

Plot
Tobal No. 1 takes place in the year 2048 on a fictional planet called Tobal, which has large deposits of Molmoran, an ore that can be used as an energy source. The planet's 98th tournament is held to determine who has the rights to the ore. A number of humans and aliens compete for the title. The game's plot and character backstories are only explored in the instruction manual. All of the initial eight playable characters receive the same ending.

The game's immediately playable characters include Chuji Wu, Oliems, Epon, Hom, Fei Pusu, Mary Ivonskaya, Ill Goga, and Gren Kutz. Bosses include Nork, Mufu, and the emperor Udan. All bosses are unlockable after defeating them in Dungeon Mode except Nork. Instead, the game allows the player to select Snork (Small Nork), a pint-sized version of the very large character. There is also one secret fighter named Toriyama Robo (named for Akira Toriyama) who is unlockable if the player can complete the 30-floor Udan's Dungeon level in the quest mode. Toriyama Robo is not seen at any point in the game except at the very end of the dungeon.

Development
Director Seiichi Ishii felt that since Tobal No. 1 was being created for a home console instead of the arcade, it would primarily be played as a single player game and thus needed greater depth in the gameplay design to compensate for the greater depth when playing against a human opponent. This led to his designing the game's Quest mode.

Music
The music in Tobal No. 1 was composed by eight of Square's composers: Yasunori Mitsuda, Yasuhiro Kawakami, Ryuji Sasai, Masashi Hamauzu, Junya Nakano, Kenji Ito, Noriko Matsueda, and Yoko Shimomura. Unlike the common themes of techno and rock found in other fighting games, Tobal No. 1 contains a complete mixture of sound, varying instrumental and electronic music, with styles ranging in hip hop, ambient, 1980s groove, jazz, and Latino, attributed to the diversity of the composers' styles. The soundtrack was released by DigiCube in Japan on August 21, 1996 and contains 21 tracks found in the game, including one unreleased track. The album was arranged by GUIDO, who later released their own 7-track remix disc, Tobal No. 1 Remixes Electrical Indian.

Tobal No. 1 Original Sound Track

Reception

Upon release in Japan, it topped the Japanese sales charts, driven by demand for the Final Fantasy VII demo that came with the game. Tobal No. 1 became the eighth best-selling video game of 1996 in Japan, where it sold 752,000 copies that year. The strong sales have been attributed to the inclusion of the Final Fantasy VII demo disc, a highly anticipated title at the time. The game is cited as a cult hit in North America, where it did not sell as well. It sold 99,183 copies in the United States, bringing total sales to  copies in Japan and the United States.

The game received mostly positive reviews. A Next Generation critic said that it "establishes itself as a major player in an established genre ... with its innovative gameplay and unique graphic approach." He especially praised the control interface, the deep counter system, the unrestricted 3D movement, and the intuitive controls for all of these elements. His one criticism was that the opponent AI is too simplistic to make single-player anywhere near as enjoyable as the multiplayer mode. Bruised Lee of GamePro was less enthusiastic about the controls, saying they take time to master. He concluded the game is outclassed by competition such as Tekken 2 and Virtua Fighter 2, but is still worth trying due to its unique style of animation and quest mode. The four reviewers of Electronic Gaming Monthly also said the controls take getting used to, but highly praised the animation and 3D gameplay. They regarded the battle mode as the highlight but said the quest mode and Final Fantasy VII demo were nice bonuses which add to the game's value-for-money. IGN noted the game's unique graphical representation and free-ranging controls—it ran at 60 frames per second and in 640x480 resolution. GameSpot admired the variety of fighting styles in the game's normal mode, but found the same controls worked sluggishly in the unique Quest Mode. Game Revolution found the blocking system to be confusing but called the game's quest mode the "most innovative feature since—well, bosses."

Sequel

The game's sequel, Tobal 2, was released in 1997 for the PlayStation in Japan. A mobile phone version, titled Tobal M, was released in Japan on December 12, 2007.

See also
 List of Square Enix video game franchises

Notes

References

External links
 Tobal No. 1 at Square-Enix.com
 

1996 video games
3D fighting games
Akira Toriyama
Fighting games
Multiplayer video games
PlayStation (console) games
PlayStation (console)-only games
Square (video game company) games
Square Enix franchises
Video games developed in Japan
Multiplayer and single-player video games
DreamFactory games
Video games scored by Junya Nakano
Video games scored by Kenji Ito
Video games scored by Masashi Hamauzu
Video games scored by Noriko Matsueda
Video games scored by Ryuji Sasai
Video games scored by Yasuhiro Kawakami
Video games scored by Yasunori Mitsuda
Video games scored by Yoko Shimomura